The Story of Tracy Beaker is a British children's book first published in 1991, written by Jacqueline Wilson and illustrated by Nick Sharratt.

Background
The book is told from the point of view of Tracy Beaker, a troubled ten-year-old girl. Tracy is often unhappy and has problems with her behaviour because she is lonely, frustrated and feels unloved. Tracy lives in a children's residential care home (nicknamed "The Dumping Ground") where she has been placed as a result of neglect and domestic violence. Her mother often left Tracy to stay by herself when Tracy was very young and does not appear to have an interest in her daughter's life. Tracy is unhappy because she has not had any contact with her mother for a long time. She seems to miss her mum a lot and it results in her sitting by the same window hoping her mum would come and pick her up. She has difficulty getting along with the staff and the other children at the care home (especially a girl named Justine Littlewood). Another reason Tracy is frustrated and angry is because she was rejected by a couple called Julie and Ted who attempted to foster her after discovering they were expecting a child of their own, knowing Tracy's background with younger children (especially an incident involving Tracy shutting a baby in a cupboard).

From an adult's point of view, Tracy has "behavioural problems" and she is always telling tales. Tracy's imaginative stories seem to provide a high level of comfort and security for her. For example, a recurring story that Tracy likes to tell is that her mother is a glamorous Hollywood movie star, and that she is coming to collect her someday. Tracy says that her mother is so busy being in films that she does not have time for Tracy. Among other things, Tracy's autobiography details her life so far, her being "deprived and abused" in the children's home (for example, she is deprived of Mars Bars and Smarties) and the types of revenge she would like to take upon her enemies.  She often portrays a deep and complicated mind.

In 2002 the book was voted the winner of the Blue Peter People's Choice Award.

Sequels 
Wilson has written three sequels to the book, The Dare Game, Starring Tracy Beaker, and Tracy Beaker's Thumping Heart (a Red Nose Day Special).

Adaptations

The Story of Tracy Beaker was adapted for television by the BBC ran for five series on CBBC from 8 January 2002 to 9 February 2006, featuring Dani Harmer as Tracy Beaker. The first series was filmed in London, but from series two, the series moved to Wales due to a suggestion from the producer, Jane Dauncey. In 2008, a spin-off from The Story of Tracy Beaker, was announced under the working title of Beaker's Back', but the show was named 'Tracy Beaker Returns instead. It aired on CBBC for three series from 8 January 2010 to 23 March 2012. The former La Sagesse School in Jesmond, Newcastle upon Tyne was used as The Dumping Ground set In March 2012, Amy Leigh Hickman announced a spin-off from Tracy Beaker Returns called The Dumping Ground in the CBBC HQ. It had been announced following Dani's decision to quit her role as Tracy and has aired on CBBC since 4 January 2013; it is currently in its tenth series. The first series was filmed at the same location as Tracy Beaker Returns, but since Series Two, the series has been filmed in Morpeth, Northumberland. The series have also had spin-off series.

In late 2006, The Story of Tracy Beaker was adapted into a musical, featuring Sarah Churm as Tracy Beaker.

See also

 List of The Story of Tracy Beaker episodes

References 

 
1991 British novels
British children's novels
Tracy Beaker novels
Doubleday (publisher) books
Tracy Beaker series
British novels adapted into films
1991 children's books